Palacios del Sil is a village and municipality located in the region of El Bierzo (province of León, Castile and León, Spain) . According to the 2004 census (INE), the municipality has a population of 1,373 inhabitants. Palacios del Sil is also a village.

Notable people 
Some of the most known writers in asturleonés language have their origin in this municipality, as Eva González, Roberto González-Quevedo or Severiano Álvarez.

See also 
El Bierzo

References

Municipalities in El Bierzo